The Men's team sprint LC1-4 CP3/4 track cycling event at the 2008 Summer Paralympics was competed on 10 September. It was won by the team representing .

Qualifying

10 September 2008, 11:15

Final round

10 September 2008, 16:15
Gold

Bronze

Team Lists

References

M